Amanita lesueurii is a species of fungus in the family Amanitaceae found in Western Australia.

References

lesuerii